La Brecha is a town in the Mexican state of Sinaloa. It stands at 
. It is part of Guasave Municipality.

Population (2010): 2,075

References

Populated places in Sinaloa